Maurizio Gaudino (born 12 December 1966) is a German football coach and former professional footballer who is director of football for SSV Reutlingen 05.

As a player, he was a midfielder who notably played in the Bundesliga for VfB Stuttgart, Eintracht Frankfurt and VfL Bochum and in the Premier League for Manchester City. He also played top flight football in Mexico, Turkey and Switzerland for Club América, FC Basel and Antalyaspor. He also played for Waldhof Mannheim where he both started and finished his career. He was capped 5 times by Germany, scoring one goal.

Playing career
Gaudino was capped five times for Germany in 1993 and 1994, and was in their squad for the 1994 World Cup.

Gaudino played 294 Bundesliga games for Waldhof Mannheim, VfB Stuttgart, Eintracht Frankfurt and VfL Bochum. He won the league title with Stuttgart in 1992. He also helped them to the 1989 UEFA Cup Final and got himself on the scoresheet in the first leg, although they ultimately lost to a Diego Maradona inspired Napoli.

In 1995, he was loaned out to Manchester City and helped the team end the season with some magnificent performances including a 3–2 victory over the league champions that year Blackburn Rovers. He scored three times in 20 league games, but City still finished 17th in the Premier League (just three places clear of relegation) after a promising early season run of form had hinted at a UEFA Cup place or even a push for the league title.

Gaudino joined FC Basel's first team for their 1997–98 season under head coach Jörg Berger. After playing in five test games Gaudino played his domestic league debut for his new club in the away game in the Olympique de la Pontaise on 9 July 1997 as Basel were defeated 0–3 by Lausanne-Sport. He scored his first goal for his club on 19 July in the home game in the St. Jakob Stadium against Servette. But this penalty goal could not help the team, because Basel were defeated 1–3. Gaudino scored one hat-trick for the club, this was on 4 April 1998 as Basel beat Étoile Carouge 3–1. Gaudino played with the club for just this one season. During this time he played a total of 42 games for Basel scoring a total of 16 goals. 30 of these games were in the Nationalliga A, one in the Swiss Cup and 11 were friendly games. He scored 10 goals in the domestic league, the other six were scored during the test games.

Following his time in Basel Gaudino signed for VfL Bochum and he stayed here only one season. He transferred to Antalyaspor in 1999 and played for them until Antalyaspor's relegation to Second League A Category in 2001–02 season.

Coaching career
In 2004 he took temporary charge of SV Waldhof Mannheim.

On 11 May 2015, Gaudino was appointed as new director of football at SSV Reutlingen 05 valid from 1 July 2015.

Personal life
Gaudino is son of Italian emigrants from Campania. His father was born in Orta di Atella while his mother is from Frattamaggiore. His son Gianluca is currently playing for Swiss club Lausanne Sport.

In 2006, Gaudino took part in a charity football match between England and Germany, based on the 1966 FIFA World Cup Final. In a game consisting of celebrities and former players, he was rugby tackled by future British prime minister Boris Johnson.

Honours
VfB Stuttgart
 UEFA Cup: runner-up 1988–89
 Bundesliga: 1991–92
 DFL-Supercup: 1992

Antalyaspor
 Turkish Cup: runner-up 1999–2000

References

External links

 
 
 

1966 births
Living people
People from Rhein-Neckar-Kreis
Sportspeople from Karlsruhe (region)
German footballers
Association football midfielders
Germany international footballers
Germany under-21 international footballers
German football managers
1994 FIFA World Cup players
SV Waldhof Mannheim players
VfB Stuttgart players
Eintracht Frankfurt players
VfL Bochum players
FC Basel players
Premier League players
Manchester City F.C. players
German sportspeople of Italian descent
Club América footballers
Bundesliga players
2. Bundesliga players
Antalyaspor footballers
Liga MX players
Süper Lig players
Swiss Super League players
German expatriate footballers
Expatriate footballers in Mexico
Expatriate footballers in England
Expatriate footballers in Switzerland
Expatriate footballers in Turkey
SV Waldhof Mannheim managers
German expatriate sportspeople in England
German expatriate sportspeople in Mexico
German expatriate sportspeople in Switzerland
German expatriate sportspeople in Turkey
Footballers from Baden-Württemberg
West German footballers